Rexy is the colloquial nickname for a fictional Tyrannosaurus rex that appears throughout the Jurassic Park franchise. She first appeared in Michael Crichton's 1990 novel Jurassic Park, and made her onscreen debut in the 1993 film adaptation, directed by Steven Spielberg. She returns in the 2015 film Jurassic World and its sequels, Jurassic World: Fallen Kingdom (2018) and Jurassic World Dominion (2022).

For the original film, special-effects artist Stan Winston created an animatronic T. rex measuring 20 feet high and 40 feet long, while Industrial Light & Magic (ILM) created a CGI version for certain scenes. Colin Trevorrow served as the primary writer and director of the Jurassic World trilogy. Although other T. rexes appeared in the preceding Jurassic Park sequels, Trevorrow sought to bring back the same individual from the first film. ILM again worked on the animal for each of the Jurassic World films. Effects artist Neal Scanlan also created an animatronic for Fallen Kingdom.

The films do not specify a name for the animal. "Rexy" came into common usage among fans after the release of Jurassic World, although the name had also been used previously in Crichton's novel. The name "Roberta" was also used by visual-effects artist Phil Tippett in his storyboards for the original film.

Appearances
In the Jurassic Park novel and its film adaptation, the T. rex is among many genetically engineered dinosaurs on the fictional Isla Nublar, the site of a planned theme park and zoo. She eventually escapes her enclosure and goes on to terrorize the main characters throughout the story. At the end of the film version, velociraptors corner Alan Grant, Ellie Sattler, and Lex and Tim. However, the T. rex unexpectedly arrives and battles the raptors, inadvertently saving the humans.

In Jurassic World, the island is home to a dinosaur theme park that has operated for years, with the T. rex as a prime attraction. The animal has a reduced role compared with the original film, appearing primarily at the end to battle the escaped Indominus rex; it succeeds with help from a Mosasaurus and a Velociraptor named Blue. Isla Nublar is abandoned by the end of the film, leaving the T. rex and other dinosaurs to reclaim the island.

Jurassic World Camp Cretaceous is a television series set during and after the events of Jurassic World. The same T. rex appears several times in the series, terrorizing teenage campers who are stranded on Isla Nublar.

The T. rex makes several appearances throughout Jurassic World: Fallen Kingdom, which sees the dinosaurs being relocated to California for a black market auction, before escaping into the wilderness.

In Jurassic World Dominion, the T. rex has been loose for years before being captured and sent to live at Biosyn's sanctuary in the Dolomites. There, it battles a Giganotosaurus for superiority, eventually killing the latter. A deleted scene takes place during the Cretaceous and shows the same animals in battle during that time period, though with the Giganotosaurus prevailing; a mosquito then lands on the deceased T. rex and sucks its blood, which would eventually be used to clone the present-day T. rex and its genetically akin relatives. The scene is included in the film's extended edition and as part of a five-minute prologue.

Production background

Jurassic Park

Special-effects artist Stan Winston worked on the dinosaurs for the first film. At the time, it was the largest sculpture ever made by Stan Winston Studio. The studio building had to be modified for the construction of the animatronic. Jack Horner, the film's paleontological consultant, called the animatronic "the closest I've ever been to a live dinosaur". The animatronic was used in a scene set during a storm, depicting the T. rex as she breaks free from her enclosure. Shooting the scene was difficult because the foam rubber skin of the animatronic would absorb water, causing the dinosaur to shake from the extra weight. In between takes, Winston's team had to dry off the dinosaur in order to proceed with filming. Winston's team initially created a miniature sculpture of the T. rex, serving as a reference for the construction of the full-sized animatronic. Industrial Light & Magic (ILM) also scanned the miniature sculpture to create CGI shots of the animal. The T. rex roar was created by combining the sounds of a baby elephant, a tiger, and an alligator.

In the first film, the T. rex was originally supposed to be killed off. Halfway through filming, director Steven Spielberg realized that the T. rex was the star of the film and decided to have the script changed just before shooting the death scene. The changes resulted in the final ending, in which the T. rex inadvertently saves the human characters by killing a pack of velociraptors. Spielberg had the ending changed out of fear that the original ending, without the T. rex, would disappoint audiences.

Jurassic World trilogy
Although preceding Jurassic Park sequels had featured other T. rexes, Colin Trevorrow sought to bring back the same individual from the first film. Trevorrow, primary writer and director for the trilogy, said about the T. rex's return, "We took the original design and obviously, technology has changed. So, it's going to move a little bit differently, but it'll move differently because it's older. And we're giving her some scars and we're tightening her skin. So, she has that feeling of, like, an older Burt Lancaster". Motion capture was used to portray the T. rex, and a full-scale foot was created for lighting reference and to help with framing shots.

For its appearance in Fallen Kingdom, ILM sent Neal Scanlan the T. rex model previously used for Jurassic World. Using the model, Scanlan created a full-scale 3D print of the T. rex head and shoulders. The life-size T. rex animatronic, which had the ability to breathe and move its head, was controlled with joysticks. It was used for a scene where the sedated T. rex is inside a cage, while Owen Grady and Claire Dearing attempt to retrieve blood from her for a transfusion to help Blue. The beginning shots of the scene were created using only the animatronic, while the ending shots solely used CGI. The middle portion of the scene used a combination of the two methods. Trevorrow said about the dinosaur, "We've been following this same character since the beginning; she's the same T. rex that was in Jurassic Park and in Jurassic World. She is iconic—not just because she's a T. rex, but because she's this T. rex".

Trevorrow described the Cretaceous fight as an origin story for the T. rex "in the way we might get to do in a superhero film. The T-Rex is a superhero for me". Regarding its death to the Giganotosaurus, Trevorrow called it "such a horrifying loss for all of us who grew up with the T. rex. To build this into something that feels like a revenge picture that takes place over 65 million years was one of my favorite ideas that we had". At the end of Dominion, the T. rex encounters two other tyrannosaurs, which Trevorrow confirmed as the same duo featured in The Lost World: Jurassic Park (1997). Trevorrow said he wanted to "really make the audience want her to find peace. We want her to find a home. She feels like she has been constantly displaced, time and time again. For her to find a family and sense of belonging is what I want". For Dominion, Trevorrow wanted to reuse the animatronic T. rex from Fallen Kingdom. However, it had already deteriorated, as is common for animatronics. Instead, the animal was portrayed entirely through CGI.

Scientific accuracy
A scene in the first film depicts the T. rex chasing a Jeep. Animator Steve Williams said he decided to "throw physics out the window and create a T. rex that moved at sixty miles per hour even though its hollow bones would have busted if it ran that fast". In the film, it is stated that the T. rex has been recorded running as fast as 32 miles per hour, although scientists believe that its actual top speed would have ranged from 12 to 25 miles per hour. In the novel and its film adaptation, it is stated that the T. rex has vision based on movement, but later studies indicate that the dinosaur had binocular vision, like a bird of prey.

The physical appearance of the T. rex in the Jurassic World films is contrary to new discoveries about the dinosaur. For consistency, the films have continued to depict the dinosaur with its wrists pointing downward at an unnatural angle, whereas the real animal had its wrists facing sideways toward each other. The Jurassic World Dominion prologue features the animal lightly covered in protofeathers.

Name
Two tyrannosaurs are featured in Crichton's novel: a juvenile and an adult. Robert Muldoon, the theme park's game warden, refers to the adult on several occasions as "Rexy". Visual-effects artist Phil Tippett had worked on the original film, and his storyboards referred to the T. rex as "Roberta". The films themselves do not specify a name for the animal. Following the release of Jurassic World, fans began referring to the individual as "Rexy", and the name was later used by Sammy, a character in Camp Cretaceous.

Reception 
Writing for Screen Rant in 2017, Tom Chapman ranked the franchise's T. rexes, including "Rexy", among its greatest characters. In 2020, Rafarl Sarmiento from Screen Rant listed the T. rex as the best dinosaur in the franchise: "The T-Rex is both awe-inspiring and horrific, but at the end of the day, it's just an animal (that actually existed) fulfilling its instinct. Yet it carries an aura of grand showmanship, something that really represents the spectacle that Jurassic Park could offer." In response to fan criticism about the T. rex being portrayed as weak in battles, Trevorrow noted that this individual would be near the end of its life during the Jurassic World films.

References

Bibliography 
 

Jurassic Park characters
Fictional clones
Fictional dinosaurs
Female film villains
Female literary villains
Literary characters introduced in 1990
Film characters introduced in 1993